The Finnish Olympic Committee is the national Olympic committee in Finland for the Olympic Games movement. It is a non-profit organisation that selects teams, and raises funds to send Finnish competitors to Olympic events organised by the International Olympic Committee (IOC).

Presidents

See also
Finland at the Olympics
Finnish Paralympic Committee

References

External links 
 Official website

National Olympic Committees
Ol
1907 establishments in Finland

Sports organizations established in 1907